Chrosiothes episinoides is a species of comb-footed spider in the family Theridiidae. It is found in Chile.

References

Theridiidae
Spiders described in 1963
Endemic fauna of Chile